Guilty is the third solo studio album by Hugh Cornwell, released in 1997 on the Madfish label.

The album was released in the US on 23 February 1999 on Velvel Records as Black Hair, Black Eyes, Black Suit with different artwork and two additional tracks: "Jesus Will Weep" and "Not Hungry Enough," and without "Five Miles High".

Critical reception

AllMusic's Jack Rabid wrote that the album is "focused, well-conceived, and finely written as the Stranglers' better post-Black and White LPs." He added that Cornwell "has proven himself a minor master of mannered pop with purpose before, and he's done it again here."

Track listing

Personnel
 Hugh Cornwell - vocals, guitar, banjo
 Steve Lawrence - bass, backing vocals
 Phil Andrews - keyboards, backing vocals
 Chris Bell - drums, percussion
 Laurie Latham - additional percussion
Technical
 Laurie Latham - producer, engineer
 Ray Mascarenas - assistant engineer
 Crispin Murray - mastering 
 Tim Young - mastering 
 Al at Spot On Design - art design
 Tim Kent - photography

References

1997 albums
Hugh Cornwell albums
Albums produced by Laurie Latham